Korkmaskala (Torqali or Къоркъмаскъала, Qorqmasqala) is a rural locality (a selo) and the administrative center of Kumtorkalinsky District of the Republic of Dagestan, Russia. Population:

References

Notes

Sources

Rural localities in Kumtorkalinsky District